Tinto is a locality of Cameroon located in the South-West Region and the Manyu . It is the district seat or district capital of the Upper Banyang(District) subdivision of Cameroon. Home to the Banyangi people. Along with UPPER BANYANG, the Tonto Council covers an area of 1217 km2.

History 
The commune of Tinto (Tinto Council) was created in 1995 by the breaking up of the Mamfé Commune.

Geography 
The commune extends over an eastern part of the Manyu department, and borders eight Cameroonian communes:  Mamfé, Widikum, Batibo, Wabane, Alou, Fontem, Nguti.

People 
At the 2005 census, Tinto Town had 2046 inhabitants.

References

External links
 Site de la primature - Élections municipales 2002 
 Contrôle de gestion et performance des services publics communaux des villes camerounaises - Thèse de Donation Avele, Université Montesquieu Bordeaux IV 
 Charles Nanga, La réforme de l’administration territoriale au Cameroun à la lumière de la loi constitutionnelle n° 96/06 du 18 janvier 1996, Mémoire ENA. 

Communes of Southwest Region (Cameroon)
Populated places in Southwest Region (Cameroon)